The German Bilanzrechtsmodernisierungsgesetz (short: BilMoG) is a German accounting law reform act usually first applied in fiscal year 2010. It emphasizes that the supervisory board has to (1) guarantee the effectiveness internal control system of a firm, (2) check the internal audit function and (3) evaluate the risk management system.

References

External resources
 Original law (in German): Bundesgesetzblatt Jahrgang 2009 Teil I Nr. 27

2010 establishments in Germany
Financial regulation
Accounting terminology
Regulation in Germany